Sandfloegga or Sandfloeggi is a mountain in Ullensvang Municipality in southeastern Vestland county, Norway. It lies on the southern part of the vast Hardangervidda mountain plateau, and is the highest mountain on Hardangervidda when the bordering summits of Hardangerjøkulen and Folarskardnuten are omitted.

From the summit, the Folgefonna glacier is seen in the northwest, the mountain Hårteigen in the north, the Hallingskarvet mountain ridge and the glacier Hardangerjøkulen in the northeast, and the mountain Gaustatoppen in the east.

See also
List of mountains of Norway

References

Ullensvang
Mountains of Vestland